WHTK may refer to:

 WHTK (AM), a radio station (1280 AM) licensed to Rochester, New York, United States
 WNBL (FM), a radio station (107.3 FM) licensed to South Bristol Township, New York, United States, known as WHTK-FM from 2009 to 2012
 WALR-FM, a radio station (104.1 FM) licensed to Greenville, Georgia, United States, known as WHTK-FM in January 1994